Thomas Robinet (born 18 August 1996) is a French professional footballer who plays as a forward for AS Nancy.

Career
Robinet's youth career started at FCO Chandieu, before spending five years with Lyon and then spending time at Saint-Priest. Whilst at Saint-Priest he was part of the Pôle Espoir (part of the structure of French Football showcasing young talent) in Dijon, and was signed by FC Sochaux-Montbéliard into their youth system in 2011.

He made his debut for Sochaux on 31 July 2015, in the first round of the 2015–16 Ligue 2 season, coming on as a late substitute in the 0–0 draw at Clermont. His full debut came later the year, on 15 October, in the 1–0 win over Evian Thonon Gaillard F.C. On 20 January 2016 he signed his first professional contract with the club, committing himself to Sochaux until 2018. His first league goal for the club came on 12 August 2016, in a 2–1 victory at Clermont.

In the summer of 2019, at the end of his Sochaux contract, Robinet left the club and signed for Championnat National side FC Villefranche. After scoring 9 goals in 22 league appearances, he moved to Stade Lavallois in May 2020, signing a one-year contract, with an option for two more should Laval secure promotion.

References

External links
 
 
 

1996 births
Living people
French footballers
Association football forwards
Ligue 2 players
Championnat National players
FC Sochaux-Montbéliard players
FC Villefranche Beaujolais players
Stade Lavallois players
LB Châteauroux players
AS Nancy Lorraine players